Sergio Arends (born 8 December 1993) is a South African cricketer. He played in one List A and three first-class matches in 2015 and 2017.

References

External links
 

1993 births
Living people
South African cricketers
Eastern Province cricketers
Free State cricketers
Cricketers from Kimberley, Northern Cape